Midway is an unincorporated community in Webster Parish, Louisiana, United States.

References

Unincorporated communities in Webster Parish, Louisiana
Unincorporated communities in Louisiana